Seadrill is a deepwater drilling contractor for the petroleum industry. It is incorporated in Bermuda for tax purposes and managed from London and Houston The company operates semi-submersible platforms, jackup rigs and drillships.

History
Seadrill was incorporated as a Bermuda company on May 10, 2005 by John Fredriksen, a Norwegian-born shipping tycoon, and listed on the Oslo Stock Exchange in November 2005.

In July 2005, the company acquired jack up rigs from Odfjell Drilling.

In September 2006, the company acquired a controlling share of Smedvig by outbidding Noble Corporation.

In 2007, the company acquired Eastern Drilling.

In May 2010, the company outbid Ensco (now Valaris plc) for Scorpion Offshore, valuing the company at $567 million.

In 2014, Seadrill conducted an initial public offering of its North Atlantic Drilling subsidiary, which owns harsh environment rigs. Seadrill continued to own 70% of North Atlantic Drilling.

In April 2013, the company sold the majority of its tender rig and semi-tender operation to SapuraKencana.

In May 2013, the company sold Tender rigs T-15, T16 and the West Vencedor to Seadrill Partners LLC.

In June 2013, the company acquired a majority interest in Sevan Drilling.

In November 2014, the company suspended dividend payments as a result of a downturn in the industry.

In December 2017, the company filed bankruptcy. The company emerged from bankruptcy in July 2018. However, the company had its shares delisted from the New York Stock Exchange in June 2020.

On October 1, 2020, Seadrill announced the appointment of new CEO Stuart Jackson, replacing Anton Dibowitz with immediate effect.

In November 2020, Seadrill has collaborated with Forbearance.

In December 2022, it was announced Seadrill had acquired the London-headquartered owner of offshore drilling units, Aquadrill LLC, in an all-stock deal worth $958 million USD.

Controversies

Bribery allegations
In 2015, Petrobras alleged bribery in the negotiations of rig contracts signed by Sevan Drilling, a subsidiary of Seadrill, in 2005-2008.

Environmental damage due to rig fire

In November 2009, Seadrill's West Atlas jackup rig, which was located on Montara field, about 690 kilometers offshore of Darwin, Australia, caught fire after the field had been leaking oil for ten weeks. The rig was operated by the Thai firm PTTEP. For 74 days, gas and oil ran into the Timor Sea, in what was one of the worst environmental disasters in Australian history.

References

External links

Companies formerly listed on the New York Stock Exchange
Companies listed on the Oslo Stock Exchange
Companies established in 2005
Petroleum industry in Norway
Drilling rig operators
Service companies of Norway
Companies of Bermuda
Companies that filed for Chapter 11 bankruptcy in 2017
Companies that filed for Chapter 11 bankruptcy in 2020